Goniotorna valentini is a species of moth of the family Tortricidae. It is found on Bioko, an island in the Atlantic off Equatorial Guinea.

References

Moths described in 2008
Goniotorna